The year 677 BC was a year of the pre-Julian Roman calendar. In the Roman Empire, it was known as year 77 Ab urbe condita . The denomination 677 BC for this year has been used since the early medieval period, when the Anno Domini calendar era became the prevalent method in Europe for naming years.

Events
https://www.biblepicturepathways.com/677-bc-date.php

Births

Deaths

King Xi of Zhou, King of the Zhou Dynasty of China.

References

 
670s BC